Višķi Parish is an administrative unit of Augšdaugava Municipality in the Latgale region of Latvia.

Towns, villages and settlements of Višķi Parish 
 Višķi

 
Parishes of Latvia
Latgale